Leng Su Sìn is a commune (xã) and village of the Mường Nhé District of Điện Biên Province, northwestern Vietnam. 

Leng Su Sin has been historically populated by the Hani people but have witnessed large Hmong migration in recent years.  

Communes of Điện Biên province
Populated places in Điện Biên province